John Riggs Murdock (September 13, 1826 – November 12, 1913) was the leader of the most Mormon pioneer down-and-back companies in Latter-day Saint history, leading ox-drawn wagon trains that carried both merchandise and passengers "down and back" from Missouri to Utah.

The son of John Murdock, he led not only several down-and-back companies but also served several missions in the eastern United States. He was also a prominent church leader in Beaver, Utah.

Biography
Murdock was born in Orange, Ohio to John Murdock and Julia Clapp Murdock. When he was five years old, his mother died and he was then raised in the home of Philo Judd.  In Nauvoo Illinois, Murdock worked on the farm of Joseph Smith. During the exodus from Nauvoo to the west, Murdock lived with the Cornelius Lott family in Nauvoo; Murdock fell in love with and later married Lott's daughter Almira Henrietta Lott. The marriage of Murdock and Lott happened after the arrival in the Salt Lake Valley.

Murdock later married Mary Ellen Wolfenden and May Bain as plural wives.

In 1846, Murdock joined the Mormon Battalion and arrived in Salt Lake City in 1847. After marrying, he settled in Lehi, Utah Territory, in 1851. From 1861 to 1863, served as Mayor of Lehi. In 1856, Murdock was one of the rescuers of the Mormon pioneer handcart companies. In 1861, 1862, 1863, 1864, and 1864, Murdock led down-and-back companies across the plains.

For a time Murdock served as the regional presiding bishop in Beaver County, Utah. Murdock was called to this position in 1864 and it was then that he first went to Beaver.

Murdock served eight terms in the Utah Territorial Legislature. He was a member of the Utah Constitutional Convention. He also served one term as a member of the Utah State House of Representatives.

Murdock was the first president of the Beaver Stake when it was organized in 1869.  He served in this position until 1891. He was later ordained a patriarch. As stake president, Murdock essentially ran the government operations in Beaver County while the Mormon-backed People's Party was in control. For example, in the 1870s, John Hunt was appointed as sheriff of Beaver County largely because he was a People's Party supporter.

Murdock was a member of the apportionment and boundaries committee of the 1895 Utah State Constitutional Convention.

Murdock was closely involved with the movement to start a secondary school in Southern Utah, so when it was finally begun at Beaver, it was named the Murdock Academy. This institution functioned as a branch of Brigham Young Academy, the predecessor of Brigham Young University.

Murdock died in Beaver at age 87. His is the largest grave marker in Mountain View Cemetery in Beaver. Immediately adjacent are markers for Mary Ellen Wolfenden Murdock and May Bain Murdock, two of his plural wives. At the behest of their second wife, Wolfenden, the location is some distance away from the grave of Almira Henrietta Lott Murdock (d. 1878), her bitter rival who preceded her in death.

Notes

References

1826 births
1913 deaths
19th-century Mormon missionaries
American leaders of the Church of Jesus Christ of Latter-day Saints
American Mormon missionaries in the United States
Brigham Young University people
Mayors of places in Utah
Members of the Mormon Battalion
Members of the Utah House of Representatives
Members of the Utah Territorial Legislature
19th-century American politicians
Mormon pioneers
Patriarchs (LDS Church)
People from Beaver, Utah
People from Cuyahoga County, Ohio
People from Lehi, Utah